Canyon was an American slowcore band from Washington, D.C., United States.  Their style was heavily influenced by Americana, folk and country music.

History
The band was formed in 1999 after ex-Boys Life member Brandon Butler relocated from Kansas to the Washington, D.C. area and briefly fronted the band Farewell Bend. Originally playing shows under the moniker Vita Bruno, the initial Canyon lineup consisted of members from several influential DC post-hardcore bands including John Wall from Kerosene 454 and Vin Novara from the Crownhate Ruin. The band released their first LP in 2001 on John Wall's Slowdime Records and toured nationally afterwards.

By the time the record was released, fellow Boys Life member Joe Winkle had arrived in D.C., prompting a lineup shift that saw the departure of Wall and Novara, along with the addition of keyboardist Derry deBorja, bassist Evan Berodt, and drummer Dave Bryson. The self-titled album was picked up and re-released by Gern Blandsten Records, who also released their second full-length, "Empty Rooms," in 2002. Further touring ensued, including an opening slot for former Uncle Tupelo/Son Volt member Jay Farrar, and the recording of a live album for DCN Records.

The Canyon song "Mansion on the Mountain('Live in NYC' version)," from "Empty Rooms," is in the default library for Windows XP and subsequent versions of Windows.

On November 19, 2010, Canyon reunited as a four-piece featuring Butler, Winkle, and a supporting rhythm section, to play at the Black Cat in Washington DC. deBorja, Berodt, and Bryson were not featured in this reunion.

Connections
Derry deBorja, Evan Berodt, and Dave Bryson later played with the DC-based Americana outfit Revival before deBorja and Bryson joined Son Volt as full-time members. Brandon Butler continues to play solo and with a backing band; he has released two albums for Gypsy Eyes Records, "Killer on the Road" and later "Lucky Thumbs." Vin Novara played with the DC band Perfect Souvenir, and is again playing with 1.6 Band.

Members
 Brandon Butler - guitar, lap steel, harmonica
 John Wall - vocals, bass
 Joe Winkle - guitar, harmonium, lap steel
 Derry deBorja - Fender Rhodes, keyboards, accordion
 Evan Berodt - bass guitar
 Vin Novara - percussion
 Dave Bryson - percussion
 Amy Heath - trumpet
 Yalan Papillons - vocals
 Michael Pahn - hand claps

Discography
Canyon (Slowdime Records, 2001; re-released on Gern Blandsten Records)
Empty Rooms (Gern Blandsten, 2002)
Live in NYC (DCN Records, 2003)
Ten Good Eyes EP (Wichita Recordings, 2005)

References

External links
 C A N Y O N - Official Site
 [ Canyon at Allmusic.com]
 Brandon Butler solo website

Musical groups from Washington, D.C.
Musical groups established in 1999
Wichita Recordings artists
1999 establishments in Washington, D.C.